The Illinois Derby is a race for Thoroughbred horses for three year olds run over a distance of one and one-eighth miles (9 furlongs) on the dirt at Hawthorne Race Course in Stickney/Cicero, Illinois, just west of Chicago in early April each year. The event was first run in 1923 at the Hawthorne Race Course.  The purse is $250,000.

History

The race was named in honor of the home state in which it was run, the state of Illinois. The inaugural running of the race took place at Hawthorne in 1923 and was won by In Memoriam, the 3 year-old champion with Zev that year. The race was then run at Sportsman's Park from 1924 through 1931. It moved to Aurora Downs racetrack in 1932 and was run there until 1938. In 1939 the race went on hiatus until through 1962. Then the race was revived at Sportsman's Park Racetrack again in 1963 where it remained through its 2002 running. The race was not run 1939-1962 and 1970-1971. 

The race was first graded in 1973 when the grading system started as a grade three stakes race and in 1997 was elevated to a grade two stakes race. The inaugural running of the race in 1923 was run at  miles.

Prior to 2000 the race was run between the Kentucky Derby and the Preakness Stakes thus competing with the second leg of the Triple Crown for good runners. Beginning in 2001, the Illinois Derby was moved to four weeks prior to the Kentucky Derby and instantly become a major Triple Crown prep race. 

The 2002 Illinois Derby won by War Emblem was the last Derby run at Sportsman's Park Racetrack. War Emblem went on to become a "Dual Classic Winner" by winning the Kentucky Derby and the Preakness Stakes. War Emblem helped elevate the prestige of the Illinois Derby by displaying that a race winner could go on to even bigger glory. 

In 2004 Pollard's Vision also helped increase the stature of the race when he won it. Pollard's Vision was a colt who was blind in his right eye, he was named in honor of Seabiscuit's jockey Red Pollard, who also lost sight in his right eye.   

In 2006 Sweetnorthernsaint, the Illinois Derby winner that year, helped the stature of the race after recording the highest beyer speed figure of the year in the race and was installed as the morning line favorite in the Kentucky Derby. Sweetnorthernsait went on to become the Preakness Stakes runner up to Bernardini in the race where Barbaro was fatally injured. 

In 1997, at Sportsman's Park, Wild Rush set the record for the fastest time in the Illinois Derby at 1:47.51.

It had been a Grade II race with an offering a purse of $500,000, however it was reduced to a Grade III race for 2010 by the American Graded Stakes Committee. Since that time. For 2012, the purse has been reinstated to $500,000, but reduced to $400,000 in 2015.

Winners since 1968

Earlier winners

1967 - Royal Malabar
1966 - Michigan Avenue
1965 - Terra Hi (1st Div)
1964 - Nushka
1963 - Lemon Twist
1939 - 1962 Race not run
1938 - Gov. Chandler
1937 - Case Ace
1936 - Rushaway
1935 - Sun Portland
1934 - Mata Hari
1933 - Sweeprush
1923 - In Memoriam

See also
 Illinois Derby top three finishers and starters

References

External links
 The Illinois Derby at Pedigree Query
  The American Graded Stakes Committee of the Thoroughbred Owners and Breeders Association, 2010

1923 establishments in Illinois
Horse races in Illinois
Hawthorne Race Course
Flat horse races for three-year-olds
Triple Crown Prep Races
Graded stakes races in the United States
Recurring sporting events established in 1923